The 2001–02 season is often regarded as one of the most successful seasons of Ayr United's history. In this season they eliminated Stranraer, Kilmarnock, Inverness CT and Hibernian en route to the Scottish League Cup Final, in which they were beaten by Rangers. In the Scottish Cup they beat Deveronvale, Dunfermline Athletic and Dundee United before losing out to Celtic in the semi-final. While maintaining good cup runs the club sustained a respectable finish of Third Place in Division One.

Competitions

Pre season

Scottish First Division

Matches

Scottish Challenge Cup

Scottish League Cup

Scottish Cup

Final League Table

References

Ayr United F.C. seasons
Ayr United